The Animalist Movement (MA) is a sister party of and, practically, a faction within Forza Italia (FI), a centre-right political party in Italy. MA's aim is to protect animal rights.

Its leader is Michela Brambilla, Minister of Tourism (2009–2011) in Silvio Berlusconi's fourth government), although Berlusconi is also a member. During the party's founding event, Berlusconi stated that the MA could gain 20% of the vote in the next Italian general election and Brambilla stressed that the party was attracting people from several cultural and political backgrounds.

Supporters/members include Fiona Swarovski, Rita Dalla Chiesa, Marina Ripa di Meana, Andrea Roncato, and Carla Rocchi, president of the Animal Protection National Body (ENPA) association and former member of the Italian Parliament (elected in 1992, 1994, 1996 and 2001) for the Federation of the Greens, a party she left in 2001 because she perceived it as too leftist (according to her, the party's shift to left caused its decline). On August 10, Rinaldo Sidoli, the Italian Green Party's Spokesperson on Animal Issues joined Brambilla's new party, becoming 'Responsabile centro studi Movimento Animalista'. He stated his decision: "Is the only party advocated for animal protection and is a great example of how politics can take a lead on animal welfare. Greens have made the wrong decision looking too much forwards left and forgetting the meaning of transversal politics". He resigned on June 26: "is not anymore a transversal party".

References

2017 establishments in Italy
Animal advocacy parties
Animal rights organizations
Green conservative parties
Political party factions in Italy
Political parties established in 2017